The cleptoparasitic bee genus Osiris is a rare group of apid bees from the Neotropics (Mexico through Argentina), that lay their eggs in the nests of bees in the related tribe Tapinotaspidini, such as Paratetrapedia. Most of the known species are pale yellowish, smooth and shining, and very wasp-like in appearance.

Females in this tribe are unusual in having the last metasomal sternite elongated to form a sheath for the sting, which is remarkably long.

References
Shanks, S. S. (1986). A revision of the neotropical bee genus Osiris (Hymenoptera: Anthophoridae). Wasmann J. Biol. 44 (1-2): 1-56
C. D. Michener (2000) The Bees of the World, Johns Hopkins University Press.

Apinae
Bee genera
Hymenoptera of North America
Hymenoptera of South America
Insects of Central America
Insects of Brazil
Insects of Mexico
Taxa named by Frederick Smith (entomologist)